The following list of optometry schools covers many countries, although the list is not exhaustive. Internationally, optometry as a profession includes different levels of education. The institutions listed below provide academic and professional education and clinical training that ranges from Doctor of Optometry degree level to other professional degrees in optometry and also non-degree level education leading to a diploma or other qualifications in optometry.

In many countries the role of optometry is statutorily defined, practice is regulated and there is uniformity in professional education and clinical training and the scope of practice is consistent with the definition of optometry as a profession. In such countries the nomenclature of terminal qualification may be reviewed as and when necessary. In Australia, for example, Doctor of Optometry (OD) is now established at University of Melbourne (first intake 2011) and OD is described as "an internationally recognised qualification and the gold standard for optometry education."

Australia 
 Deakin University - Bachelor of Vision Science, Master of Optometry
 Flinders University Bachelor of Medical Science (Vision Science), Master of Optometry
 Queensland University of Technology - BAppSc (Optom) - replaced with Bachelor of Vision Science / Master of Optometry from February 2009
 University of Canberra - Bachelor of Vision Science, Master of Optometry
 University of Melbourne - OD
 University of New South Wales - Bachelor of Vision Science/Master of Clinical Optometry

Bangladesh
 4 Years Bachelor of Science in Optometry (B. Optom) course in Institute of Community Ophthalmology, Chittagong Medical University since 2010 www.icoedu.org

Brazil
 Universidade do Contestado, as a partner of Fundación Universitaria San Martín, of Bogotá, Colombia

Bulgaria
 Sofia University St. Kliment Ohridski

Canada
 Université de Montréal, Québec
 University of Waterloo School of Optometry and Vision Science, Ontario

Colombia
Fundación Universitaria del Area Andina, Pereira and Bogotá
Fundación Universitaria San Martín, Bogotá
Universidad Antonio Nariño, Bogotá
Universidad de La Salle, Bogotá - Master in Vision Science
Universidad del Bosque, Bogotá
Universidad Metropolitana, Barranquilla
Universidad Santo Tomás, Bucaramanga

Czech Republic
 Czech Technical University, Prague
 Masaryk University, Brno
 Palacký University, Olomouc

Oman
 4 Years Degree Program in Optometry (B. Optom) university of Buraimi .

Ecuador
 Universidad Metropolitana, Quito

El Salvador
 Universidad de El Salvador, San Salvador - Licenciado en Optometría

France 
 Institut des Sciences de la Vision, St Etienne
 Institut d'optique Graduate School, Paris - ISO
 Paris-Saclay University, Orsay

Ghana
 Kwame Nkrumah University of Science and Technology - Doctor of Optometry
 University of Cape Coast - Doctor of Optometry

Greece
Technological Educational Institute of Athens, Department of Optics and Optometry

Hong Kong
 The Hong Kong Polytechnic University

Hungary 
Semmelweis University, Faculty of Health Sciences -  Optometry within Medical Diagnostic Analysis Bsc 

India
At present there are more than fifty schools of optometry in India. In 1958, two schools of optometry were established, one at Gandhi Eye Hospital, Aligarh in Uttar Pradesh and the other at Sarojini Devi Eye Hospital, Hyderabad in Andhra Pradesh, under the second five-year plan by Director General of Health Services of Government of India. These schools offered diplomas in optometry courses of two years duration validated by state medical faculties. Subsequently, four more schools were opened across India at Sitapur Eye Hospital, Sitapur in Uttar Pradesh, Chennai (formerly Madras) in Tamil Nadu, Bengalooru (formerly Bangalore) in Karnataka, Al Salama College of Optometry, Perinthalmana, Malappuram and Regional Institute of Ophthalmology (Govt medical college), Thiruvananthapuram (formerly Trivandrum) in Kerala.

The Elite School of Optometry (ESO) was established in 1985 at Chennai and was the first to offer a four-year degree course. This was followed by All India institute of Medical Sciences, New Delhi and in Kerala Al Salama College of Optometry, Perinthalmana, Malappuram is the first private colleges to offer a bachelor's degree in optometry, Started in 2005, Regional Institute of Ophthalmology (Govt Medical college), Thiruvananthapuram (formerly Trivandrum) is the first government colleges to offer a bachelor's degree in optometry in 2010; were considered as the best in excellence from Govt. of India.

The following list includes educational institutions offering four year degree courses, two or three year diploma courses and also non-degree courses. Post-graduate education in optometry is also offered in India leading to M.Optom, M.Phil., M.Sc. and Ph.D. by several universities.
 Al Salama College of Optometry - Perinthalmanna, Calicut and Kannur, Kerala
 All India Institute of Optometrical Sciences (Academic Wing of Indian Optical Institute and Refraction Hospital Trust), Kolkata, West Bengal
 IIMT University Meerut, India
 Amity University Gurgaon, Haryana
 Al Salama College of Optometry & Health Science- Coimbatore, Tamil Nadu
 Advanced College of Optometry & Health Sciences, Sanpada,Navi Mumbai
 Bareilly Institute of ParaMedical Sciences & S.S. Hospital, Bareilly, Uttar Pradesh
 Bausch & Lomb School of Optometry, Hyderabad, Andhra Pradesh 
 Bharathiar University, Coimbatore, Tamil Nadu 
 Bharati Vidyapeeth University, Medical College, School of Optometry, Pune, Maharashtra.
 Rayhan Eye hospital and Institute of Optometry, Edappal, Triprayar, Kondotty and Tirur, Kerala
 Bharatimaiya College of Optometry, Surat, Gujrat
 Dr. Anand College of Optometry and Vision Science, Salem, Tamil Nadu
 Dr. DY Patil Institute of Optometry & Visual Science (Deemed) University Maharashtra
 Dr. N.T.R. University Of Health Sciences Vijayawada, Andhra Pradesh
 Elite School of Optometry, Chennai, Tamil Nadu
 FAHS (Faculties of Allied Health Sciences Pondicherry), Vinayaka Missions University Tamil Nadu 
 Govt. Medical college Kozhikode
 George college of management and science
 Himalayan University, Arunachal Pradesh
 IGNOU (Central University), Delhi
 ITM Institute of Health Science, (Deemed) University, Mumbai, Maharastra
 Jadhavpur University, Kolkata, West Bengal
 Jamia Hamdard (Deemed) University, Delhi
 Jankalyan Eye Hospital Educational and research Institute, Lucknow, Uttar Pradesh
 J.R.N. Rajasthan vidyapeeth (Deemed) University, Rajasthan
 Kalyani University, Kolkata, West Bengal
 Kerala University of Health and Allied sciences. 
 Laxmi College of Optometry, Mumbai, Maharastra
 Lotus College of Optometry, Mumbai, Maharastra 
 Madurai Kamraj University, Tamil Nadu
 Manipal University, Manipal, Karnataka
 Martin Luther King University, Shillog, Meghalaya
 Municipal Eye Hospital, School of Optometry, Mumbai, Maharastra
 Nagar school of Optometry, Gujarat University, Ahmedabad, Gujrat 
 Netaji Subhash Institute of Optometry, Mumbai
 Netrajyothi college of Health Science (Optometry), Bangalore, Karnataka
 NIMS University, Rajasthan 
 NSHM Knowledge Campus, Kolkata, West Bengal 
 Rabindra Bharti University, Kolkata, West Bengal
 Regional Institute of Ophthalmology, Thiruvananthapuram, Kerala
 RGUHS, Karnataka
 Sankara College of Optometry, Bangalore, Karnataka
 Sankara College of Optometry, Ludhiana, Punjab
 Sharda University, Greater Noida, Uttar Pradesh
 Shri Ganpati Netralaya College of Optometry, Jalna, Maharastra
 Dr. Agarwals Institute of Optometry (a unit of Dr. Agarwal's Eye Hospital), Chennai, Tamil Nadu
 Shri Rajaram Memorial Eye Hospital, Optometry research & Training Institute, Banda, Uttar Pradesh
 Shri Vaishnav Poloticnic College Indore, Madhya Pradesh
 Sri Ramchandra University, Porur, Tamil Nadu
 Srimanta Sankaradeva University of Health Science, Assam
 SRM University, Chennai, Tamil Nadu 
 Susruta School of Optometry & Visual Sciences, Cochin, Kerala
 The Tamil Nadu Dr.M.G.R Medical University Chennai, Tamil Nadu
 Tripura University, Agartala, Tripura
 School of Medical sciences, University of Hyderabad, Telangana.
 University of Mumbai, Maharashtra
 Uttrakhand University, Uttrakhand
 Vasan Institute of Ophthalmology and Research, Chennai, Tamil Nadu
 Vasan Institute of Ophthalmology and Research, Coimbatore, Tamil Nadu
 Vasan Institute of Ophthalmology and Research, Salem, Tamil Nadu
 Veer Narmad South Gujrat University, Surat, Gujrat
 Vidyasagar College of Optometry and Vision Science, Kolkata, West Bengal
 West Bengal University of technology, Kolkata, West Bengal
 Yashwantrao Chavan Maharashtra Open University (YCMOU), Nasik, Maharashtra

Iran
Iran University of Medical Sciences, Tehran
Mashhad University of Medical Sciences, Mashhad
Shahid Beheshti University of Medical Sciences, Tehran
Zahedan University of Medical Sciences, Zahedan

Ireland
Dublin Institute of Technology, Dublin - BSc in Optometry

Israel
 Bar-Ilan University
 Hadassah College

Italy
Currently there are seven state universities (in Milano, Padova, Lecce, Roma, Firenze, Napoli, and Torino) offering three-year university degrees in optics and optometry (Ottica e Optometria), formally a kind of a physics degree.

 University of Florence
 University of Milano-Bicocca
University of Padua, Italy
 University of Naples Federico II
 University of Roma Tre
 University of Salento
 University of Turin

Optometry education in Italy starts in 1969-70. Some post-secondary non-university courses are currently active (2020). Their program can be accessed only by licensed opticians. Some of the more appreciated schools are:

 IRSOO, Vinci, Florence
 IBZ, Bologna

Latvia
 University of Latvia, Riga, Latvia - bachelor's and master's degrees

Lebanon
American University of Science and Technology
Lebanese University, Faculty of Public Health
Institut Technique Industriel Supérieur
Modern University for Business and Science

Malaysia
International Islamic University Malaysia
International University College of Technology Twintech
Management & Science University 
National Institute of Ophthalmic Sciences 
SEGi University College 
Universiti Kebangsaan Malaysia
Universiti Teknologi MARA
UCSI University

Mexico
 National Polytechnic Institute, Unidad Santo Tomas and Unidad Milpa Alta
 Universidad Nacional Autónoma de México
 Universidad Autónoma de Aguascalientes - Mestría en Ciencias Biomédicas Area de Optometria
 Universidad Autónoma de Ciudad Juárez
 Universidad Xochicalco, Campus Ensenada and Campus Tijuana

Nepal
 Tribhuwan University, B.P. Koirala Lions Centre for Ophthalmic Studies, Maharajgunj Medical Campus - four-year bachelor's degree program only, with no post-graduate programs available
 National Academy of Medical Sciences (NAMS) Bir Hospital has launched "Bachelor in Optometry and Vision Science" program in 2018.  It is a four years program and the total quota for the enrollment is 40 only.

The Netherlands
 University of Applied Sciences Utrecht

New Zealand
 School of Optometry and Vision Science - BOptom
 University of Auckland

Nigeria
There are seven schools offering the O.D. (Doctor of Optometry) degree. 
 Abia State University Uturu, Abia State - also offers MSc and PhD programmes in Clinical Optometry in combination with FNCO
 Bayero University, Kano, Kano State
 Federal University of Technology Owerri
 Imo State University, Owerri, Imo State
 Madonna University Okija, Anambra State
 University of Benin, Ugbowo, Benin-City, Edo State, Nigeria - also offers MSc programmes in vision science
 University of Ilorin, Kwara State.

Norway
 Buskerud University College

Pakistan
 College of Ophthalmology and Allied Vision science, KEMU, Lahore
 Fatima Memorial College of Medicine and Dentistry, Lahore
 Isra School of Optometry, Isra University, Karachi
 University of Lahore, Islamabad Campus, Islamabad
 Superior University Lahore
 Munawar Memorial Hospital & College of Optometry, Chakwal
 Pakistan Institute of Community Ophthalmology, Peshawar
 Pakistan Institute of Ophthalmology, Al-Shifa Trust Eye Hospital, Rawalpindi
 Pakistan Institute of Rehabilitation Science, (PIRS) ISRA University Islamabad Campus, Islamabad
 Basheer Institute of Medical Sciences, Bara Khau, Islamabad
 Pef University College, Peshawar
 Rashid Latif Medical College
 Rawalpindi Medical College, Rawalpindi
 The University of Faisalabad
 University of Lahore, Department of Optometry and Vision Sciences (DOVS), Lahore

Philippines
 Cebu Doctors' University
 Centro Escolar University
 Davao Doctors' College
 Emilio Aguinaldo College
 Lyceum-Northwestern University
 Manila Central University
 Mindanao Medical Foundation College
 Southwestern University (Philippines)
 LPU-St. Cabrini School of Health Sciences, Inc.
 National University-Moa

Poland
 Adam Mickiewicz University
 Poznan University of Medical Sciences
 University of Warsaw
 Wrocław University of Technology
 Ludwik Rydygier Collegium Medicum in Bydgoszcz

Portugal
 University of Beira Interior
 University of Minho
 [Instituto Superior de Educação e Ciências] https://www.iseclisboa.pt/index.php/pt/optometria 
 [ESCOLA PORTUGUESA DE ÓPTICA OCULAR - UPOOP] https://upoop.pt/wp/epoo/

Russia
 The Helmholtz Research Institute for Eye Diseases
 Saint Petersburg Medical Technical College

Saudi Arabia
 King Saud University, Riyadh - Doctor of Optometry (OD) and master's degree in Vision Science
 Qassim University, Buraidah, Al-Qassim - Doctor of optometry (OD)

Singapore
 Ngee Ann Polytechnic
In 2009 University of Manchester (UK) and Singapore Polytechnic set up a degree course in optometry within the premises of Singapore Polytechnic. The degree is not recognised by the General Optical Council (GOC) in the United Kingdom. This course has since been stopped due to staffing issues.
 Singapore Polytechnic

South Africa
 University of the Free State, Free State,
 University of Johannesburg, Gauteng,
 University of KwaZulu-Natal, Kwazulu Natal,
 University of Limpopo, Limpopo,

4 Year bachelor's degrees including clinical optometry

Sri Lanka

School of Ophthalmic Technology, established in 1983 by the ministry of health at National Eye Hospital Colombo with the initiation of Dr. C E Parker III., honours the diploma in ophthalmic technology. However, a degree programme does not exist. These ophthalmic technologists are trained for the purpose of government hospitals.

The course is also undergone by other SAARC countries: Nepal, Maldives and Pakistan.

Optometry courses are conducted by private institutes such as Eye Care Institutes, Sri Lanka optometric association and vision care academy to provide diploma program

However, the government of Sri Lanka does not recognize optometry as a profession and has no regulations to date.

Sudan
 Al-Neelain University - 5-year bachelor'sFaculty of optometry and visual sciences

Established in 1954 as institute of optometry in Khartoum eye hospital.
Joined ministry of Higher Education in 1986 as the High Institute of Optometry, and lastly was annexed to Alneelain University in 1997 when it was re- named to become Faculty of Optometry and Visual Sciences (FOVS).

Currently FOVS has the following programs:

1- BSc optometry in 5 years with sub- specialization in either orthoptics,  contact lenses, ocular photography or ocular neurology.
2- Diploma in ophthalmic technology in 3 years.
3- Diploma in optical dispensary in 3 years.

FOVS also offers MSc and PhD degrees in Optometry.

FOVS is the only of its kind in Sudan and is the first in Middle East  and Africa .

In 2010, Alneelain University Eye Hospital was established as part of   FOVS  to expand training capacity and to serve community.

Sweden
 Karolinska Institutet - 3-year bachelor's degree in optometry and a one-year master program in clinical Optometry.
 Linnaeus University, Kalmar - 3-year bachelor's degree in optometry

Switzerland
 University of Applied Sciences Northwestern Switzerland - Institute of Optometry  (To practice Optometry in Switzerland required an approval from regulatory board)
 Swiss American International Academy - Geneva, Switzerland (To practice Optometry in Switzerland required an approval from regulatory board)

Taiwan
There are currently seven universities offering a bachelor's degree in optometry and four educational institutions offering an associate degree in optometry:
 Asia University
 University of Kang Ning
 Central Taiwan University of Science and Technology
 Chung Hwa University of Medical Technology
 Dayeh University
 Yuanpei University of Medical Technology
 Chung Shan Medical University
 Mackay Junior College of Medicine, Nursing and Management 
 Hsin Sheng College of Medical Care and Management
 Jen-Teh Junior College of Medicine, Nursing, and Management
 Shu-Zen College of Medicine and Management

Thailand
 Naresuan University
 Ramkhamhaeng University
 Rangsit University
 Thammasart University

Trinidad & Tobago
 University of the West Indies, St. Augustine Campus

United Kingdom
There are 12 educational institutions in the United Kingdom offering degrees in optometry. Nine are located in England with one optometry school in each of Northern Ireland, Wales and Scotland. Additionally, in England, the Institute of Optometry offers a post-graduate professional doctorate (Doctor of Optometry degree) in partnership with London South Bank University. The Doctor of Optometry postgraduate degree is also offered at Aston University, Birmingham. The Aston Doctor of Optometry  includes academic modules in independent pharmaceutical prescribing, alongside advanced optometry modules in glaucoma, retinal/macular disease, myopia and many others.

England
 Anglia Ruskin University, Cambridge
 City, University of London
 University of Aston, Birmingham
 University of Bradford
 University of Hertfordshire
 University of Manchester
 University of Plymouth
 University of Portsmouth
 University of the West of England, Bristol
 University of Huddersfield

Wales
 Cardiff University

Scotland
 Glasgow Caledonian University

Northern Ireland
 University of Ulster, Coleraine campus

United States
Twenty-three American educational institutions offer the Doctor of Optometry degree. 
AL: University of Alabama at Birmingham
AZ: Midwestern University Arizona College of Optometry, Glendale
CA: Southern California College of Optometry at Marshall B. Ketchum University
CA: University of California, Berkeley
CA: Western University of Health Sciences
FL: Nova Southeastern University
IL: Illinois College of Optometry
IL: Midwestern University Chicago College of Optometry, Downers Grove
IN: Indiana University
KY: University of Pikeville - Kentucky College of Optometry
MA: Massachusetts College of Pharmacy and Health Sciences
MA: New England College of Optometry
MI: Michigan College of Optometry at Ferris State University
MO: University of Missouri at St. Louis
NY: State University of New York in New York City
OH: Ohio State University
OK: Northeastern State University Oklahoma College of Optometry
OR: Pacific University, Forest Grove
PA: Salus University, Pennsylvania College of Optometry
PR: Interamerican University of Puerto Rico, School of Optometry
TN: Southern College of Optometry
TX: University of Houston
TX: University of the Incarnate Word

See also
List of medical schools
List of dental schools in the United States

References 

Optometry